Alfred Arthur Boniface (27 January 1917 – 3 May 1945) was an Australian rules footballer who played for the Footscray Football Club in the Victorian Football League (VFL).

Notes

External links 
		

1917 births
1945 deaths
Australian rules footballers from Victoria (Australia)
Western Bulldogs players
Yarraville Football Club players